A list of notable Christian Democracy politicians of Italy:

Politicians

A
Lucio Abis
Lorenzo Acquarone
Umberto Agnelli
Angelino Alfano
Beniamino Andreatta
Tina Anselmi

B
Mario Baccini
Sergio Berlinguer
Giovanni Bersani
 Giovanni Bianchi
Rosy Bindi
Carlo Bo
Guido Bodrato
Marcello Boldrini
Bruno Boni
Rocco Buttiglione

C
Salvatore Cardinale
Guido Carli
Vincenzo Carollo
Carlo Casini
Angelo Cerica
Vito Ciancimino
Mario Cingolani
Giuseppe Codacci Pisanelli
Ludovico Corrao
Alfredo Corrias
Luigi Crespellani
Salvatore Cuffaro

D
Luciano Dal Falco
Alcide De Gasperi
Costante Degan
Giovanni Del Rio

F
Franca Falcucci
Amintore Fanfani
Publio Fiori
Giuseppe Fioroni
Marco Follini
Dario Franceschini

G
Remo Gaspari
Pietro Giubilo
Ermanno Gorrieri
Giorgio Grigolli
Giovanni Gronchi

I
Rosa Russo Iervolino

J
Angelo Raffaele Jervolino

L
Giuseppe La Loggia
Lodovico Ligato
Salvo Lima
Raffaele Lombardo

M
Benedetto Majorana della Nicchiara
Franco Maria Malfatti
Piero Malvestiti
Nicola Mancino
Raimondo Manzini
Giovanni Marcora
Franco Marini
Alberto Marvelli
Piersanti Mattarella
Giuseppe Medici
Piero Mentasti
Francesco Merloni
Silvio Milazzo
Tommaso Morlino
Angelo Munzone

O
Leoluca Orlando

P
Filippo Maria Pandolfi
Aldo Patriciello
Lapo Pistelli
Romano Prodi

R
Gianni Rivera
Virginio Rognoni
Attilio Ruffini

S
Adolfo Sarti
Vittorio Sbardella
Claudio Scajola
Oscar Luigi Scalfaro
Pietro Scoppola
Vincenzo Scotti
Antonio Segni
Mariotto Segni
Gustavo Selva
Nicola Signorello
Pietro Soddu
Gian Mario Spacca
Giovanni Spagnolli
Giuseppe Spataro
Gaetano Stammati
Luigi Sturzo

T
Bruno Tabacci
Paolo Emilio Taviani
Zefferino Tomè
Umberto Tupini

V
Riccardo Ventre
Donato Veraldi

Z
Giuseppe Zamberletti
Franco Zeffirelli
Ennio Zelioli-Lanzini

Deputies

A
Giancarlo Abete
Salvatore Aldisio
 Giuseppe Alessi
Giulio Andreotti
Dario Antoniozzi

B
Piero Bargellini
Gerardo Bianco
Antonio Bisaglia
Guido Bodrato
Vito Bonsignore

C
Pier Ferdinando Casini
Pierluigi Castagnetti
Paolo Cirino Pomicino
Francesco Cossiga
Carlo Cremaschi

D
Clelio Darida
Ciriaco De Mita
Augusto Del Noce

E
 Franco Evangelisti

F
Mario Fasino
Arnaldo Forlani
Roberto Formigoni

G
Antonio Gava
Giovanni Gioia
Carlo Giovanardi
Giovanni Goria
Achille Grandi
Luigi Gui
Angela Maria Guidi Cingolani

K
Bruno Kessler

L
Giorgio La Pira
Giuseppe Lazzati
Giovanni Leone
Concetto Lo Bello

M
Mino Martinazzoli
Clemente Mastella
Bernardo Mattarella
Sergio Mattarella
Giuseppe Micheli
Aldo Moro

P
Giuseppe Pella
Attilio Piccioni
Flaminio Piccoli
Giuseppe Pisanu

R
Franco Restivo
Mariano Rumor

S
Oscar Luigi Scalfaro

T
Fernando Tambroni

V
Athos Valsecchi

Z
Benigno Zaccagnini
Adone Zoli

 
Christian Democrats